Razg (also known as Razak, Razk, Razq, Razzāq, and Razzīq) is a village in Bayg Rural District, Bayg District, Torbat-e Heydarieh County, Razavi Khorasan Province, Iran. At the 2006 census, its population was 463, in 117 families.

References 

Populated places in Torbat-e Heydarieh County